The 2018–19 Florida A&M Rattlers basketball team represented Florida A&M University in the 2018–19 NCAA Division I men's basketball season. They played their home games at the Teaching Gym in Tallahassee, Florida, and were led by second year head coach Robert McCullum as members of the Mid-Eastern Athletic Conference. Florida A&M is ineligible for postseason play due to failure to meet the APR multi-year threshold. They finished the season 12–19 overall, 9–7 in MEAC play, finishing in a tie for fifth place.

Previous season
The Rattlers finished the 2017–18 season 9–25, 7–9 in MEAC play to finish in a tie three-way tie for seventh place. As the No. 9 seed in the MEAC tournament, they defeated Howard before losing to Hampton in the quarterfinals.

Roster

Schedule and results

|-
!colspan=12 style=| Exhibition

|-
!colspan=12 style=| Non-Conference Regular season

|-
!colspan=12 style=| MEAC regular season

|-

Source

References

Florida A&M Rattlers basketball seasons
Florida AandM Rattlers
Florida AandM Rattlers basketball team
Florida AandM Rattlers basketball team